Chrysophyllum prieurii is a tree in the family Sapotaceae, native to South America and Panama.

Description
Its fissured bark is brown to reddish-brown. Fascicles feature up to 10 green flowers.

Distribution and habitat
Chrysophyllum prieurii is native to an area from Panama in the north to Brazil and Peru in the south.

References

prieurii
Flora of Panama
Flora of northern South America
Flora of western South America
Flora of Brazil
Plants described in 1844
Taxa named by Alphonse Pyramus de Candolle